Testoni is an Italian surname and may refer to:

 Bruto Testoni (born 1891–1949), Italian wrestler
 Claudia Testoni (1915–1998), Italian athlete
 Nic Testoni (born 1972), Australian actor
 Pier Alberto Testoni (born 1950), Italian fencer
 Testoni–Valla rivalry, rivalry between two Italian female athletes, Claudia Testoni and Ondina Valla in the 1930s

See also
 Teston (disambiguation)

Italian-language surnames